Danubit was an industrial plastic explosive produced by the Slovak company .
It had been used for many decades intended primarily as a rock blasting explosive for surface and underground mass mining of mineral raw materials. Underwater blasting applications were possible as well.

The producer of Danubit, Istrochem, is a chemical company founded in 1847 by Alfred Nobel in Bratislava, Slovakia. The production of explosives ceased, when part of the company was acquired by the Czech company Explosia a.s., the producer of Semtex in 2009.

Characteristics

See also
 Dynamite

External links
 Istrochem (producer)

Explosives